Bridge to Terabithia is a 2007 American fantasy drama film directed by Gábor Csupó and written by David L. Paterson and Jeff Stockwell. It is based on the 1977 novel of the same name by Katherine Paterson. The film stars Josh Hutcherson, AnnaSophia Robb, Bailee Madison, Zooey Deschanel, and Robert Patrick. Its plot follows two 11-year-old friends who create a fantasy world called "Terabithia" to cope with reality and spend their free time together.

The original novel was based on events from the childhood of the author's son, screenwriter David Paterson. When he asked his mother if he could write a screenplay of the novel, she agreed in part because of his ability as a playwright. Produced by Walden Media, principal photography was shot in Auckland, New Zealand, within 60 days. Film editing took ten weeks, while post-production, music mixing, and visual effects took several months, with the film fully completed by November 2006. This was Michael Chapman's last film as a cinematographer before his retirement and eventual death in 2020.

Bridge to Terabithia was released in the United States on February 16, 2007. The film received positive reviews from critics who praised the visuals, performances and faithfulness to the source material. It was a box-office success, grossing $137.6 million worldwide against its budget of $20–25 million. At the 29th Young Artist Awards, the film won all five awards for which it was nominated.

Plot

Jesse "Jess" Aarons is an 11-year-old aspiring artist living with his financially struggling family in Lark Creek. He rides the bus to school with his younger sister May Belle where he avoids the school bully Janice Avery. In class, Jess is also bullied by classmates Scott Hoager and Gary Fulcher and meets a new student named Leslie Burke. At recess, Jess enters a running event, for which he has been training at home. Leslie also enters and manages to win, much to Jess' irritation. On the way home, Jess and Leslie learn they are next-door neighbors.

Jess has a difficult relationship with his father, who spends more time with May Belle. Due to their financial struggles, his mother also forces him to wear his older sister's sneakers. One day at school, Leslie compliments Jess' drawing ability and they become friends.

After school, they venture into the woods and swing across a creek on a rope. Jess and Leslie find an abandoned treehouse on the other side and invent a new world, which they call Terabithia. For the next few days, Jess and Leslie spend their free time in the treehouse getting to know each other.

Leslie gives Jess an art kit on his birthday. Jess becomes angry with his father for his attitude towards him and he loses his belief in Terabithia, and refuses its existence the next day at school. Later, Jess apologizes to Leslie by giving her a puppy, whom she names Prince Terrien (P.T).

Once in Terabithia, they encounter various creatures, including a giant troll resembling Janice, squirrel-like creatures resembling Hoager called "Squogers", and "Hairy Vultures" resembling Fulcher.

At school, Leslie becomes frustrated by Janice Avery's bullying. Jess and Leslie play a prank on Janice and she is embarrassed in front of everyone on the bus. Leslie introduces Jess to her parents and they help paint their house. At school, Leslie discovers from Janice that her bullying is due to her abusive father, and the two become friends, with Janice later befriending Jess as well. Jess and Leslie take P.T to Terabithia, where they fight off the Dark Master's creatures resembling their bullies, this time with the troll as their ally.

The next morning, Ms. Edmunds, the music teacher who Jess has a crush on, calls to invite him on a one-on-one field trip to an art museum. When Jess returns home, his father reveals that Leslie died after hitting her head in the creek when the rope she used snapped. Jess first denies it and runs to check on Leslie, but he notices the severed rope as well as emergency vehicles surrounding her house before eventually accepting her death.

The following day, Jess and his parents visit the Burke family to pay their respects. Leslie's father Bill tells Jess that she loved him and thanks him for being the best friend she ever had since she never had friends at her old school. Jess feels overwhelming guilt for Leslie's death, lashing out at both Hoager and May Belle, and imagining the Dark Master from Terabithia chasing after him before breaking down into tears, but his father comforts and consoles him. Jess says Leslie is gone forever, but his father tells him she will never be as long as he keeps her memory alive.

Jess decides to re-imagine Terabithia and builds a bridge across the river to welcome a new ruler. He apologizes to May Belle for snapping at her, then invites her to Terabithia and the siblings agree to rule together, with Jess as king and May Belle as the princess.

Cast

 Josh Hutcherson as Jess Aarons, a 5th grader and an aspiring artist.
 AnnaSophia Robb as Leslie Burke, a girl who Jess befriends.
 Bailee Madison as May Belle Aarons, the little sister of Jess.
 Zooey Deschanel as Ms. Edmunds, a music teacher that Jess likes.
 Robert Patrick as Jack Aarons, the father of Jess and May Belle.
 Kate Butler as Mary Aarons, the mother of Jess and May Belle.
 Devon Wood as Brenda Aarons, the older sister of Jess and May Belle.
 Emma Fenton as Ellie Aarons, the older sister of Jess and May Belle.
 Grace Brannigan as Joyce Aarons, the baby sister of Jess and May Belle.
 Latham Gaines as Bill Burke, the father of Leslie.
 Judy McIntosh as Judy Burke, the mother of Leslie.
 Patricia Aldersley as Grandma Burke, the grandmother of Leslie.
 Lauren Clinton as Janice Avery, a bully of Jess and Leslie who serves as the inspiration to the giant troll
 Isabelle Kircher as Carla
 Cameron Wakefield as Scott Hoager, one of Jess's bullies who serves as the inspiration to the squirrel-like Squogres.
 Elliot Lawless as Gary Fulcher, one of Jess's bullies who serves as the inspiration to the hairy vultures.
 Carly Owen as Madison
 Jen Wolfe as Mrs. Myers, a teacher.
 James Gaylyn as Principal Turner
 Ian Harcourt as Kenny, a bus driver.
 Phil Grieve as Mr. Bailey
 Matt Gibbons as the Dark Master, an evil being in Terebithia that antagonizes Jess and Leslie.
 Paddy as Prince Terrien, a dog that is adopted by the Burke family.

Production

Development 
The film was directed by Nickelodeon's Rugrats co-creator and former Hanna-Barbera animator Gábor Csupó, who was first recommended for the job by Walden Media President Cary Granat. Although Csupó had never worked on a live-action film before, it "didn't worry Granat in the least". Csupó stated that he was interested in making the film because he "had the ambition to do a live-action film for a long time", but that he "didn't like anything until I read this book". He described the book as "beautiful" and said that it "moved [him]". Bridge to Terabithia was cinematographer Michael Chapman's final film before his retirement. Chapman mentioned in the film's DVD commentary that he retired after shooting this film because he wanted his last film to be a good one; "this is such a beautiful story, and it's exactly the kind of movie I want to do at this time in my life".

Writing
Producer and screenwriter David L. Paterson is the novel's author's son, and his name was featured on its dedication page. The story was based on his real-life best friend, Lisa Hill, who was struck by lightning and killed when they were both eight years old. Paterson had asked his mother, Katherine Paterson, if he could write a screenplay of the novel, and she agreed "not only because he's [her] son, but also because he's a very good playwright". Paterson had difficulty marketing the screenplay, mostly because of Leslie's death; "if you can believe this, I did meet with some companies that asked if I could just 'hurt' Leslie a little bit—put her in a light coma and then bring her out".

The most important thing for Paterson was to keep the spirit of the book alive while finding a way to transform it from "a novel that takes place mostly in the characters' heads to a dynamic visual medium". Paterson knew that the film had to be about friendship and imagination. While Paterson focused on "bringing out the emotions of the story," he admitted to having difficulty writing about Terabithia "because it was too close". He credited fellow screenwriter Jeff Stockwell for recreating Terabithia for the film. "What Jeff was able to do as an outsider who wasn't so attached to the story was to really let his imagination go free and make up this world in a wonderful way", David said. Csupó noted that the two main characters are a little bit older in the film than they are in the book. Csupó reasons that the movie "deals with so many issues including friendship, and maybe first innocent love, things like that", so it "made more sense" to make the characters older.

Casting

Director Csupó stated that they had no actors initially in mind for the film. The first actor cast was AnnaSophia Robb as Leslie Burke. Robb wrote Csupó "such a beautiful, heartwarming letter" that expressed her love for the book and the character. Csupó said that he cast her because of "her letter, her enthusiasm, and her love of the material". Robb also conversed with producer Lauren Levine before casting even began, and "their conversation convinced her that, without a doubt, AnnaSophia was meant for this role". Levine said that "it was just so clear in talking to her about all this fantasy that I was basically talking to Leslie, that she had that same kind of spark and magical presence. She might be physically different from Leslie in the book, but the spirit of Leslie and the spirit of AnnaSophia are nearly identical. It was a match made in heaven." With regard to the character, Robb said "[Leslie]'s one of those people who's just always lit up, who has this glow about her, and no one can bring her down. Leslie's such a lively and energetic character, it was really fun for me to become her."

Levine stated that "looking for Jesse was a really tough hunt. We needed someone who could go from an introverted boy in an isolated world to someone who completely taps into his imagination and becomes a confident, brave leader in Terabithia. That's a heck of a range for such a young actor." Josh Hutcherson was not their first choice for the role of Jesse Aarons, but they settled with him because they "felt the chemistry between AnnaSophia Robb and him". Hutcherson said that the project appealed to him because of "the real life day-to-day drama as well as the arc of the character Jesse".

The filmmakers cast Robert Patrick as Jess's hardworking and strict father based on his previous roles in the films Walk the Line, Flags of Our Fathers, and the television series The Unit. Patrick explained that he related to the story because he was "constantly creating imaginary worlds as a kid" himself, and that the film's setting reminded him of where he grew up. He also said that he took on the role because he wanted to star in a film that his children could watch.

Csupó said that they cast Bailee Madison as May Belle Aarons after weeks of searching for an actress to play the part. He went on to say that "she had such a charm, even before the camera, she was just like a little sweetheart. She was very confident, she showed up, shook hands with everybody, totally sweet and perky. I said 'WOW!'—she was just stealing everybody's heart on the spot."

Filming
Production for the film began on February 20, 2006, with a budget of $20–25 million. Principal photography for the film was shot in Auckland, New Zealand within 60 days. Film editing took ten weeks, while post-production, music mixing, and visual effects took a few months. The film was finished by November 2006, because the crew "had to rush" to meet the February 16 deadline.

Design and effects

Csupó explained that "it was a very conscious decision from the very beginning that we're not going to overdo the visual effects because of the story's integrity and the book's integrity", because there was only a brief mention of Jess and Leslie fighting imaginary creatures in the forest in the novel. With that in mind, they "tried to do the absolute minimum, which would be required to put it into a movie version".

In designing the fantasy creatures found in Terabithia, Csupó wanted to make creatures that were "little more artsy, imaginative, fantastical creatures than the typical rendered characters you see in other movies", and drew inspiration from Terry Gilliam and Ridley Scott. Dima Malanitchev came up with the drawings for the creatures with Csupó's guidance. Csupó chose to have Weta Digital render the 3D animation because he "was impressed with their artistic integrity, the teamwork, the [fact that] people were really nice, and also they responded to our designs very positively". Weta modified some of the creature designs, but ultimately remained faithful to Csupó's original designs.

There were around 100 crew members from Weta working on the effects for the film. Weta was already working on animating the creatures while the film was being shot, and Weta crew members were on-set for all the scenes that involved special effects during the filming. Weta visual effects supervisor Matt Aitken explained that process involved in interpreting the creatures was "split into two steps". First, natural-looking creatures were created based on pencil sketches by Csupó and Malanitchev, and this was done mostly through Photoshop collages done by visual effects art director Michael Pangrazio. The second step was to figure out animation or motion styles that best suited these creatures.

Leslie's costumes in the film were designed to look as if the character "might have made some of them herself", and they were updated from those described in the book to reflect what would currently be considered eccentric.

Soundtrack

Music from and Inspired by Bridge to Terabithia is the soundtrack album to the film, released by Hollywood Records on February 13, 2007. The original score is composed by Aaron Zigman, who took over the scoring duties from Alison Krauss, after her exit from the project. Zigman, who also scored Flicka simultaneously with Bridge to Terabithia compared both the film's having Celtic influence a bit, but added the score of the latter as more modern and orchestral compared to the former. Four of the tracks from the film's score, was only featured in the soundtrack, and Zigman's score was separately released from the album, on December 2007, only for promotional use.

Release

Marketing and promotion
The promotion and advertising for the film was met with criticism and controversy. The filmmakers distanced themselves from the advertising campaign for the film, saying that it was deliberately misleading and made the film seem to be about, or occurring in, a fantasy world. David Paterson was surprised by the trailer, but understood the marketing reasoning behind it, saying:

Critics commented on the film's misleading advertisement campaign. One critic said the film was actually "grounded in reality far more than in fantasy", while another thought, "far from a computer generated escapist fantasy, this film is an unpretentious and touching tale of preteen companionship and loss".

Distribution
The film premiered at the El Capitan Theatre in Hollywood on February 16, 2007. Paterson, an alumnus of the Catholic University of America, held a special advance screening of the film for members of the CUA community at the AFI Silver Theatre in Silver Spring, Maryland on February 1, 2007. The film opened in the United Kingdom on May 4, 2007, and in New Zealand June 7, 2007. The film had a strong second place domestic opening over the Presidents' Day weekend, grossing "a higher-than-expected" $28,536,717 from 2,284 screens, earning an average of $9,885 per screen. The opening Friday box office was $6.3 million. The film has a worldwide gross of US$137 million, taking in $82 million in the US and Canada.

The DVD and Blu-ray Disc were released on June 19, 2007 in the US. The DVD and high-definition Blu-ray version shared the same special features; including: "Digital Imagination: Bringing Terabithia to Life", "Behind the Book: The Themes of Bridge to Terabithia", "Keep Your Mind Wide Open" music video by Robb, and two audio commentaries, the first with director Gábor Csupó, writer Jeff Stockwell, and producer Hal Lieberman, and the second with producer Lauren Levine and actors Hutcherson and Robb.

Reception

Critical reception

Bridge to Terabithia received positive reviews from film critics. Review aggregation website Rotten Tomatoes gives the film a score of 85% based on 158 reviews, with an average rating of 7.2/10. The site's consensus reads: "Bridge to Terabithia is a faithful adaptation of a beloved children's novel and a powerful portrayal of love, loss, and imagination through children's eyes." On Metacritic the film received a weighted average score of 74% based on 25 reviews, indicating "generally favorable reviews". Audiences surveyed by CinemaScore gave the film a grade of A−.

James Berardinelli of ReelViews called Bridge to Terabithia "easily the best family feature of the early year". Ann Hornaday of The Washington Post praised the script for being "utterly recognizable and authentic", and thought Robb and Hutcherson were "perfectly cast". Hornaday wrote that although the final five minutes succumbed to "oversweet sentiment", viewers would remember the film's "warmth and respect with which it pays homage to first love". Jessica Grose of The Village Voice commended director Csupó for omitting "cutesy tween stereotypes", and felt Jess's relationship with his father elevated Bridge to Terabithia from "a good kids movie to a classic contender." The New York Times critic Jeannette Catsoulis believed that the fantasy was kept in the background "to find magic in the everyday", and thought Csupó directed "like someone intimate with the pain of being different, allowing each personality more than a single characteristic". The reviewer praised all the leads for their strong performances, especially Deschanel and Madison. Catsoulis found the film was able to handle adult topics "with nuance and sensitivity", and being consistently smart and "delicate as a spider web", it was the kind of children's movie "rarely seen nowadays". Miriam di Nunzio of the Chicago Sun-Times praised Hutcherson and Robb's performances, saying that "the film's heart and soul rests on the abilities of its young lead characters to make us really see the world through children's eyes. The dynamic duo of Hutcherson and Robb do not disappoint."

Not all reviews were as positive, Claudia Puig of USA Today wrote that "for a movie about the power of imagination, Bridge to Terabithia is not as clever as you would hope". Puig called the film a "serviceable translation" of the novel, but thought the adult characters were caricatured. Puig found the real-life portions of the movie were "derivative and simplistic", but found Jess's emotional tumult felt "powerfully authentic, and this is where the film finds its truth and soul". The Wall Street Journal critic Joe Morgenstern felt that despite the occasional misuse of enchantment—"brief spasms of overproduced fantasy"—the novel's screen adaptation was told with "agreeable simplicity in between computer-generated monsters". Morgenstern was disappointed with the performances by the young members of the cast, which he described as "appealing but unpolished". Morgenstern thought Csupó lacked experience directing actors, and that although Deschanel was the best adult performer, she seemed self-directed. Entertainment Weeklys Gregory Kirschling was confused by the main characters' lack of excitement towards Terabithia, and felt the film could not decide if it was "a fantasy or a coming-of-age story".

Accolades
Bridge to Terabithia was nominated for seven awards, of which it won five. Josh Hutcherson was nominated at the 2008 Saturn Awards for "Best Performance by a Younger Actor". AnnaSophia Robb was nominated for a Broadcast Film Critics Association Award for "Best Young Actress". The film won five awards at the Young Artist Awards, including "Best Family Feature Film (Fantasy or Musical)". Hutcherson won "Best Performance in a Feature Film – Leading Young Actor", Robb won "Best Performance in a Feature Film – Leading Young Actress", and Bailee Madison won "Best Performance in a Feature Film – Young Actress Age Ten or Younger". The cast won the award for "Best Performance in a Feature Film – Young Ensemble Cast", which included Hutcherson, Robb, Madison, Wakefield, Clinton, Lawless, Isabelle Rose Kircher, Carly Owen, Devon Wood, Emma Fenton and Grace Brannigan.

References

External links

 
 
 
 
 

2000s coming-of-age drama films
2007 films
2000s teen drama films
2007 drama films
American coming-of-age drama films
American drama films
American teen drama films
American children's drama films
Advertising and marketing controversies in film
Disney controversies
2000s children's drama films
2000s drama films
Films about bullying
Films about child death
Films about families
Films about friendship
Films based on children's books
Films directed by Gábor Csupó
Films scored by Aaron Zigman
Films set in forests
Films shot in New Zealand
Summit Entertainment films
Scanbox Entertainment films
Walden Media films
Walt Disney Pictures films
Films about trolls
2007 directorial debut films
2000s English-language films
2000s American films